This is the list of notable people from Jhelum city and Jhelum District.

A 
 Aftab Iqbal Shamim, Urdu language poet
Afzal Khan (British politician), British Member of Parliament for Manchester Gorton
 General Asif Nawaz Janjua, former chief of army staff of Pakistan
 Azeem Hafeez, former Pakistani cricket team

B 
 Bhai Mati Das, Indian Sikh martyrs

C 

Chaudhry Altaf Hussain, politician and former governor of Punjab
Ch Muhammad Saqlain, politician and former MPA.
Chaudhry Khadim Hussain, politician

G 
 Ghulam Hussain, politician and doctor
 Gulzar, Indian poet and film director

H 
 Hasnat Ahmad Khan, a heart surgeon in Britain, also known as an ex-lover of Lady Diana

I 
 Inder Kumar Gujral, former prime minister of India

J 
 Jagjit Singh Aurora, Indian army officer
 Jaswant Singh Neki, Indian scholar and poet

K 
 Khalid Masud, Muslim scholar

M 
 M. Afzal Khan, British politician
 Masood Aslam, Pak army officer
 Major Muhammad Akram, Pak army officer, Nishan-e-Haider awarded
 Manmohan Singh, former prime minister of India was born in village of Gah, district Chakwal, then part of Jhelum District 
Muhammad Ali Mirza, Engineer and Islamic preacher

N 
 Nawabzada Raja Matloob Mehdi, politician
 Nanak Singh, Indian writer and poet
 Nasser Azam, British artist

R 
 Raja Ghazanfar Ali Khan, politician and a leader of Pakistan Movement
 Raja Yawar Kamal Khan, politician

S 
 Sunil Dutt, Bollywood actor
 Satish Gujral, Indian painter and sculptor

T 
 Admiral Tariq Kamal Khan, Chief of Naval Staff

Z 
 Zafar Chaudhry, first chief of air staff of the Pakistan Air Force he was born in Sialkot
 Zamir Jafri, writer and poet.

References

Jhelum

Jhelum-related lists